The International Student Congress Of (bio)Medical Sciences, also known as ISCOMS, is an annually held student congress on biomedical sciences. The primary aim of ISCOMS is getting medical students acquainted with research and its many elements.
750 participants from 60 countries attended the 25th edition of ISCOMS in 2018. The 26th edition of ISCOMS will take place from 3–7 June 2019 and the abstract submission is open from October 29, 2018 till February 7, 2019.

History 
ISCOMS started as a congress for medical students in Groningen, named "Studenten Congres Geneeskunde". In 2003, the Student Congres Geneeskunde changed to an international congress with the name International Student Congress of Medicine. In 2004 the name was changed to ISCOMS. In 2010, the name was changed to the International Student Congress Of (bio)Medical Sciences, to show that it is a congress for students in all biomedical fields.

Location 
ISCOMS takes place at the University Medical Center Groningen (UMCG) in the Netherlands. It is one of the largest hospitals in the world, offering supraregional tertiary care to the northern part of the Netherlands. The medical center employs almost 17,000 people, numbers almost 1400 beds and is affiliated with the University of Groningen.

Congress structure 
The congress is for (bio)medical students who are interested in research. Students may be either presenting or non-presenting participants. If a participant wants to present their research, they are required to submit their abstract beforehand. A strict selection procedure takes place and only the best students are invited to present their research at ISCOMS.

When accepted, participants are divided into different session in which they present their research. This may be either through a poster presentation, or an oral presentation where students can present their research by means of a slideshow presentation. In both sessions other students and professionals from the UMCG listen and discuss the research. Thirdly, there is a plenary session: the eight best abstracts will be presented in the primary lecture hall of the UMCG.

The congress also holds pre-course masterclasses about research skills, and a great variety of workshops during the congress days on practical skills. Besides that ISCOMS offers keynote lectures from renowned scientist presenting their research to the participants.

Moreover, ISCOMS offers an extensive social programme, where all the participants have the opportunity to get to know each other and the ISCOMS organising committees. Finally, there is a post-congress tour visiting parts of the Netherlands.

Keynote Speakers 

Nobel Prize laureates who have given a keynote lecture during one of the previous ISCOMS editions.

Healthy Ageing 
‘Healthy Ageing’ is the primary focus of research, patient care, and education & training within the University of Groningen and the University Medical Center Groningen. Knowing that ageing of the population poses an increasing burden on society, and that associated disabilities and diseases incur increasing economic, healthcare, infrastructural and personal costs that tax national societies heavily, stimulation of a healthy lifestyle is a key in order to deal with this societal challenge. Therefore, ISCOMS continues to emphasize the importance of ‘Healthy Ageing’. It is well known that lifestyles, nutritional patterns, the amount of exercise, and the use of medication are all factors that affect the development of health. However, the influences of these factors and the way they relate to each other is still unclear. As such, ISCOMS is proud to contribute to the gaining of new knowledge.

Organisational structure 
The organisation of ISCOMS consists of (bio)medical students from the University of Groningen. There are nine Executive Board members and 21 committee members. Committees include the Scientific Programme, Hosting and Logistics, International Contacts, Sponsors and Fundraising, Public Relations, and Research and Development.

ISCOMS Research Fellowships (IRF) 
ISCOMS is more than just a congress; it also incorporates several different projects. The ISCOMS Research Fellowships (IRF) is such a project and is unique in Europe and has become an integral part of the experience. It provides a starting point for students to pursue a career in medical sciences, broaden their scientific network, increase the range of their knowledge and amplify their experience with research by giving 25 enthusiastic and talented students the opportunity to join a research group in the University Medical Center Groningen. During a challenging two-week period, chosen students will work on their own individual project and for some this may transcend into a chance to conduct a long-term PhD project in Groningen.

Partners 
The official partners of the ISCOMS are:
 Leiden International Medical Student Conference (LIMSC)
 International Federation of Medical Students' Associations the Netherlands (IFMSA-NL)
 Zagreb International Medical Summit (ZIMS)
 European Medical Students' Association (EMSA)
 Asian Medical Students' Association (AMSA)
 Young European Scientists meeting Porto (YES-meeting)
 International Medical Students' Congress Novi Sad (IMSCNS)
 International Conference for Healthcare and Medical Students (ICHAMS)

Notes and references

External links
International Student Congress of (bio)Medical Sciences
Network of European Medical Students’ Conferences

Annual events in the Netherlands
Medical conferences
University of Groningen